The Girls' Schools Association (GSA) is a professional association of the heads of independent girls' schools. It is a constituent member of the Independent Schools Council.

History
The GSA can trace its history back to the Association of Headmistresses which was founded in 1874 by Dorothea Beale and Frances Buss. The aim was to agree which issues need challenging and which could be ignored. Buss served as the founding president.

Enid Essame of Queenswood School was an honorary secretary before she became president in 1960. She was succeeded by Diana Reader Harris in 1964. She served until 1966 organising a considered response to the influential Plowden Report. It was established in 1974 following the amalgamation of two of the AHM's sub-groups: the Association of Heads of Girls' boarding Schools and the Association of Independent and Direct Grant Schools. It moved from London to new headquarters in Leicester in 1984, where it shared offices with the Association of School and College Leaders (ASCL) before moving to its current office, still in Leicester.

Structure
The GSA is a member-led organisation providing mutual professional support and representing the views of practising heads of independent girls' schools.  A series of member-led committees report to a council of heads which is led by officers ie the president, vice-president (usually the previous year's president), the president-elect and treasurer. Each presidential position is usually held by a practising head for one calendar year.

Since 1994 the GSA has been supported by a professional secretariat which is currently led by Chief Executive Donna Stevens.

Member schools
Below is a list of GSA member schools. Some members are the girls' sections of "Diamond Schools".

United Kingdom

England

Scotland
Kilgraston School
 Mary Erskine School, Edinburgh
 St George's School, Edinburgh
 St Margaret's School for Girls, Aberdeen

Wales
 Haberdashers' Monmouth School for Girls
 Howell's School Llandaff
Northern Ireland
 Victoria College Belfast

Channel Islands
 Jersey College for Girls
The Ladies' College

Overseas members
 San Silvestre School, Peru
 Unison World School, India
La Vall School, Spain

Former members
 Amberfield School – closed in October 2011
 Casterton School – merged with Sedbergh School in 2013
 Lodge School – closed in 2010
 Dame Alice Harpur School and Bedford High School – merged to become Bedford Girls' School (member school) in 2011 and 2012
 Peterborough High School – became coeducational in 2010 and renamed The Peterborough School
 St Joseph's Convent School – became coeducational in 2010 and renamed St Joseph's College
 St Margaret's School, Edinburgh – closed in June 2010
 St Mary's School, Shaftesbury – closed in August 2020

See also
 Girls' Day School Trust
 List of girls' schools in the United Kingdom
 The Headmasters' and Headmistresses' Conference (HMC)

References

External links
 Official website

Education in Leicester
 
1974 establishments in England
Organisations based in Leicestershire
Organizations established in 1974
Private school organisations in England
Teacher associations based in the United Kingdom
1974 in education